The 2014 Pan American Combined Events Cup was held in Ottawa, Ontario, Canada, at the Terry Fox Stadium on July 16–18, 2014.  The event was hosted by the Ottawa Lions Track and Field Club, and served also as the Canadian Championships.   For the first time, junior categories were included in the cup, while there were also three Canadian competitors in a youth category.

A detailed report on the event and an appraisal of the results was given.

Complete results were published.

Medallists

Results

Men's Decathlon Senior
Key

Women's Heptathlon Senior
Key

Men's Decathlon Junior
Key

Women's Heptathlon Junior
Key

Medal table

Participation
An unofficial count yields the participation of 41 athletes (plus 48 guests and locals) from 10 countries.

 (6 + 2 guests)
 (11 + 40 guests)
 (1)
 (7)
 (2)
 (2 + 2 guests)
 (1)
 (3)
 (1)
 (7 + 4 guests)

See also
 2014 in athletics (track and field)

References

Pan American Combined Events Cup
Pan American Combined Events Cup
Pan American Combined Events Cup
International track and field competitions hosted by Canada
Pan American Combined
Pan American Combined Events Cup